The 1852 United States presidential election in Missouri took place on November 2, 1852, as part of the 1852 United States presidential election. Voters chose nine representatives, or electors to the Electoral College, who voted for President and Vice President.

Missouri voted for the Democratic candidate, Franklin Pierce, over Whig candidate Winfield Scott. Pierce won Missouri by a margin of 12.84%.

Results

See also
 United States presidential elections in Missouri

References

Missouri
1852
1852 Missouri elections